Goodbye, Miss Turlock is a 1948 American short film directed by Edward L. Cahn, released as one of the John Nesbitt's Passing Parade series. It won an Oscar at the 20th Academy Awards in 1948 for Best Short Subject (One-Reel).

Plot
A nostalgic look is taken at an abandoned one-room school somewhere in rural America, seen in the then-present day with its windows boarded up and in disrepair. In flashback, a day in the life of its teacher, the spinster Miss Turlock, is seen, along with various students.

The end of the film shows the school's eventual closure, brought on by improvements in transportation and the rise of central school districts. Miss Turlock's students, now all successful adults, return to the school before its closure to throw a retirement party for Miss Turlock.

Cast
 John Nesbitt as Narrator (voice)
 Nana Bryant as Miss Turlock (uncredited)
 Norman Ollestad as 'Irish', Spitball Shooter (uncredited)

References

External links

1948 films
1948 short films
Live Action Short Film Academy Award winners
Metro-Goldwyn-Mayer short films
American black-and-white films
Films directed by Edward L. Cahn
Films set in schools
Films set in the United States
1940s English-language films